Santiago Tapia is one of the Metro stations of the Monterrey Metro line 2.  It is located in the north of the Mexican city of San Nicolás de los Garza and it was opened on 1 October 2008 as part of the extension of the line from Universidad and Sendero.

This metro station bears the name of the revolutionary men born in 1820 and is located over the street of the same name.

See also
List of Monterrey metro stations

References

Metrorrey stations
Railway stations opened in 2008